Anandamayi Ma (née Nirmala Sundari; 30 April 1896 – 27 August 1982) was an Indian saint and yoga guru, described by Sivananda Saraswati (of the Divine Life Society) as  [the most perfect flower the Indian soil has produced]. Precognition, faith healing and miracles were attributed to her by her followers. Paramahansa Yogananda translates the Sanskrit epithet Anandamayi as "Joy-permeated" in English. This name was given to her by her devotees in the 1920s to describe her perpetual state of divine joy.

Biography

Early life 

Anandamayi was born Nirmala Sundari Devi on 30 April 1896 to the orthodox Vaishnavite Brahmin couple Bipinbihari Bhattacharya and Mokshada Sundari Devi in the village of Kheora, Tipperah District (now Brahmanbaria District), in present-day Bangladesh. Her father, originally from Vidyakut in Tripura, was a Vaishnavite singer known for his intense devotion. Both parents were from well regarded lineages, though the family lived in poverty. Nirmala attended village schools of Sultanpur and Kheora for approximately 2–4 months. Although her teachers were pleased with her ability, her mother worried about her daughter's mental development because of her constantly indifferent and happy demeanour. When her mother once fell seriously ill, relatives too remarked with puzzlement about the child remaining apparently unaffected.

In 1908 at the age of twelve years, 10 months, in keeping with the rural custom at the time, she was married to Ramani Mohan Chakrabarti of Bikrampur (now Munshiganj District) whom she would later rename Bholanath. She spent five years after her marriage at her brother-in-law's home, attending to housework in a withdrawn meditative state much of the time. It was at Ashtagram that a devout neighbour, Harakumar, recognised and announced her spiritual eminence, developed a habit of addressing her as "Ma", and prostrated before her morning and evening in reverence.

When Nirmala was about seventeen, she went to live with her husband who was working in the town of Ashtagram. In 1918, they moved to Bajitpur, where she stayed until 1924. It was a celibate marriage—whenever thoughts of lust occurred to Ramani, Nirmala's body would take on the qualities of death.

On the full moon night of August 1922, at midnight, twenty-six-year-old Nirmala enacted her own spiritual initiation. She explained that the ceremony and its rites were being revealed to her spontaneously as and when they were called for. Although she was uneducated in the matter, the complex rites corresponded to those of traditional, ancient Hinduism, including the offerings of flowers, the mystical diagrams (yantra) and the fire ceremony (yajna). She later stated, "As the master (guru) I revealed the mantra; as the disciple. I accepted it and started to recite it."

Dhaka

Nirmala moved to Shahbag with her husband in 1924, where he had been appointed as the caretaker of the gardens of the Nawab of Dhaka. During this period Nirmala went into ecstasies at public kirtans. Jyotiscandra Ray, known as "Bhaiji", was an early and close disciple. He was the first to suggest that Nirmala be called Anandamayi Ma, meaning "Joy Permeated Mother", or "Bliss Permeated Mother". He was chiefly responsible for the first ashram built for Anandamayi Ma in 1929 at Ramna, within the precinct of the Ramna Kali Mandir. In 1926, she reinstated a formerly abandoned ancient Kali temple in the Siddheshwari area. During the time in Shahbag, more and more people began to be drawn to what they saw to be a living embodiment of the divine.

Dehradun

From her shift Dehradun onwards various scholars were drawn to Anandamayi Ma's light, gift, power and message of love, though she continued to describe herself as "a little unlettered child". Prangopal Mukerjee Mahamahopadhyay Gopinath Kaviraj, Sanskrit scholar, philosopher, and principal of Government Sanskrit College in Varanasi and Triguna Sen were among her followers. Uday Shankar, the famous dance artist, was impressed by Anandamayi Ma's analysis of dance, which she used as a metaphor for the relationship between people and God. She was a contemporary of the well known Hindu saints like Udiya Baba, Sri Aurobindo, Ramana Maharshi, Swami Ramdas, Neem Karoli Baba, and Paramahansa Yogananda.

Death
Ma died on 27 August 1982 in Dehradun, and subsequently on 29 August 1982 a Samadhi (shrine) was built in the courtyard of her Kankhal ashram, situated in Haridwar in North India.

Teachings and public image 

Anandamayi Ma never prepared discourses, wrote down, or revised what she had said. People had difficulty transcribing her often informal talks because of their conversational speed. Further, the Bengali manner of alliterative wordplay was often lost in translation. However, her personal attendant Gurupriya Devi, and a devotee, Brahmachari Kamal Bhattacharjee, made attempts to transcribe her speech before audio recording equipment became widely available in India.

A central theme of her teaching is "the supreme calling of every human being is to aspire to self realization. All other obligations are secondary" and "only actions that kindle man's divine nature are worthy of the name of actions". However, she did not advise everyone to become a renunciate. She would dismiss spiritual arguments and controversies by stating that "Everyone is right from his own standpoint,". She did not give formal initiations and refused to be called a guru, as she maintained that "all paths are my paths" and "I have no particular path".

She did not advocate the same spiritual methods for all: "How can one impose limitations on the infinite by declaring this is the only path—and, why should there be so many different religions and sects? Because through every one of them He gives Himself to Himself, so that each person may advance according to his inborn nature." She herself has said (ref. Mother Reveals Herself), all forms of sadhana, known and unknown, just occurred to her in the form of a lila (play) without any conscious effort on her part. Thus her Sadhana can not be slotted into a specific area, for to do so would mean that she was somehow limited to that area and her mastery was also limited. She welcomed and conversed with devotees of different paths and religions from Shaivaite, Vaishnavite, Tantric, or from Islam, Christianity, Judaism, Sikhism, Buddhism, Zoroastrianism. Everyone was welcome and she was equally at ease while giving guidance to all practitioners of different faiths. Even now, the Muslim population of Kheora still refer to her as "our own Ma".

She taught how to live a God-centered life in the world and provided the living inspiration to enable thousands to aspire to this most noble ideal. She also advocated spiritual equality for women; for example, she opened up to women the sacred thread ritual, which had been performed by men only for centuries, but only those who met the moral and personal requirements. Her style of teaching included jokes, songs and instructions on everyday life along with long discourses, silent meditation and recommended reading of scriptures.

She frequently referred to herself in the third person as either "this body" or "this little girl", which is a common spiritual practice in Hinduism in order to detach oneself from Ego. Paramhansa Yogananda wrote about her in his book Autobiography of a Yogi. His meeting with her is recounted in the chapter titled "The Bengali 'Joy-Permeated Mother'", where she explains her background:

The Publication Department of the Shree Shree Anandamayee Sangha in Varanasi regularly publishes her teaching in the periodical Amrit Varta quarterly in English, Hindi, Gujarati and Bengali. The Sri Sri Anandamayi Sangha in Haridwar organizes the annual Samyam Mahavrata congregation to devote a week to collective meditation, religious discourse and devotional music.

See also 
 Bhakti yoga
 Robert Adams
 Ravi Shankar

References

Bibliography

External links 

 
  
 Anandamayi Ma's Biography at SpiritWeb
 A timeline of events
 MatriVani, a compendium of Anandamayi's teachings
 The personal papers of Anandamayi are in the Harvard Divinity School Library at Harvard Divinity School in Cambridge, Massachusetts.

1896 births
1982 deaths
20th-century Hindu religious leaders
Advaitin philosophers
Bengali philosophers
Bengali Hindus
Bengali Hindu saints
Hindu female religious leaders
Hindu mystics
Hindu revivalists
Hindu tantra
20th-century Hindu philosophers and theologians
Indian Hindu monks
Indian Hindu spiritual teachers
Indian women philosophers
People considered avatars by their followers
Shaktism
20th-century Indian philosophers
19th-century Indian women
19th-century Indian people
Indian women educational theorists
20th-century Indian educational theorists
20th-century Indian women writers
20th-century Indian writers
Women writers from Uttarakhand
Illeists
Scholars from Uttarakhand
Scholars from Dehradun
Women educators from Uttarakhand
Educators from Uttarakhand
Writers from Dehradun
Women mystics
20th-century women educators
People from Kasba Upazila
Modern yoga gurus